Searles Valley is a valley in the northern Mojave Desert of California, with the northern half in Inyo County and the southern half in San Bernardino County, California, United States.

Searles Valley is located between the Argus Range to the west and the Slate Range to the east.  Death Valley is to the northeast. The valley contains the landform features of Searles Lake and the Trona Pinnacles.

Named after John Wemple Searles.

Settlements
The Searles Valley Minerals company town of Trona is the primary settlement. Other towns in the Searles Valley include: Westend, Argus, Pioneer Point, Homewood Canyon, and Searles Valley. Sometimes Argus, Westend, Pioneer Point, and Trona are collectively referred to as Trona.

See also
Trona Railway
Panamint Valley
Indian Wells Valley
Potash wars (California)

References

External links
The Searles Valley Historical Society
 July 4, 2019 6.4 Magnitude earthquake

 
Valleys of the Mojave Desert
Valleys of San Bernardino County, California
Valleys of Inyo County, California
Valleys of California